Walnut Creek is a  tributary of the Ocmulgee River in the U.S. state of Georgia. It originates in the city of Gray in Jones County and flows into the Ocmulgee River in Macon at the southern corner of Ocmulgee National Monument.

References

USGS Hydrologic Unit Map - State of Georgia (1974)

See also
List of rivers of Georgia

Rivers of Georgia (U.S. state)